Glucan 1,4-beta-glucosidase (or 4-beta-D-glucan glucohydrolase) is an enzyme that catalyses the hydrolysis of (1->4)-linkages in 1,4-beta-D-glucans and related oligosaccharides, removing successive glucose units.

This is one of the cellulases, enzymes involved in the hydrolysis of cellulose and related polysaccharides; more specifically, an exocellulase, that acts at the end of the polysaccharide chain.  Other names for this enzyme are exo-1,4-beta-glucosidase, exocellulase, exo-beta-1,4-glucosidase, exo-beta-1,4-glucanase, beta-1,4-beta-glucanase, exo-1,4-beta-glucanase, and 1,4-beta-D-glucan glucohydrolase.

See also 
beta-glucosidase

References

External links 
 

EC 3.2.1